Ross Byrne is an Irish rugby union player. He plays as fly-half. Byrne currently plays for Irish provincial team Leinster.

On 24 October 2018, Byrne was named in the Ireland squad for the November Internationals. In November 2022 Byrne kicked a late penalty to contribute 3 points to Ireland's 13 point total in the 13–10 victory over Australia. 
In the opening match of the 2023 Six Nations, Ross Byrne replaced Jonathan Sexton as outhalf and scored a late conversion in Ireland's 34–10 win against Wales.

Honours
Leinster
European Rugby Champions Cup (1): 2018
Pro14 (4): 2018, 2019, 2020, 2021

Ireland
Six Nations Championship (1): 2023
Grand Slam (1): 2023
Triple Crown (2): 2022, 2023

Individual
United Rugby Championship Dream Team (1): 2021–22

References

External links

Leinster Profile
Pro14 Profile
Ireland Profile

1995 births
Living people
People educated at St Michael's College, Dublin
Irish rugby union players
Leinster Rugby players
Rugby union fly-halves
Ireland international rugby union players
Rugby union players from Dublin (city)